Jeramy Dodds (born 4 December 1974 in Ajax, Ontario) is a Canadian poet.

Born in Ajax, Ontario, Dodds grew up in Orono, Ontario. He studied English literature and anthropology at Trent University, medieval Icelandic studies at The University of Iceland, and has worked as a research archaeologist in Canada. He was a poetry editor at Coach House Books until January 2018.

He received the 2006 Bronwen Wallace Memorial Award and won the 2007 CBC Literary Award in poetry. His debut poetry collection, Crabwise to the Hounds (Coach House Books, 2008), received the 2009 Trillium Book Award for Poetry, and was shortlisted for both the 2009 Gerald Lampert Award and the 2009 Griffin Poetry Prize.

Bibliography
 Dodds, Jeramy. (2017) Drakkar Noir. Toronto: Coach House Books. 
 —— (Trans.). (2014). The Poetic Edda. Toronto: Coach House Books. 
 —— (2008). Crabwise to the Hounds. Toronto: Coach House Books.

References

External links
Official Website

1974 births
21st-century Canadian poets
Living people
People from Ajax, Ontario
People from Clarington
Trent University alumni
Writers from Ontario
Canadian male poets
21st-century Canadian male writers
Translators of the Poetic Edda
21st-century translators